The Nhieu Loc-Thi Nghe Canal (Vietnamese: Kênh Nhiêu Lộc – Thị Nghè) is a canal in Ho Chi Minh City, Vietnam. The 9 km (6 mile) long canal passes through Districts 1, 3, Phu Nhuan, Tan Binh and Binh Thanh and flows into the Saigon River.

Restoration 
The canal became heavily polluted following intense urban development in Ho Chi Minh City after 1975. Buildings dumped domestic trash and wastewater into the canal, leading to a dark appearance and noxious odor. A World Bank-funded project to restore the canal commenced in 2002, with the installation of sewers, dredging, and relocation of slums that bordered the canal. Truong Sa and Hoang Sa streets, which line the canal, were landscaped with trees and walking paths.

References 

Canals in Vietnam